Grace, West Virginia may refer to:

Grace, Hampshire County, West Virginia, an unincorporated community
Grace, Roane County, West Virginia, an unincorporated community